is a Japanese professional basketball player who plays for Akita Northern Happinets of the B.League in Japan. He also plays for Japan men's national 3x3 team, and competed in the 2020 Summer Olympics. He is the first Olympian from Edogawa University.

Awards and honors
3x3 Central Europe Tour 2019 - Chance 3x3 Tour Jindřichův Hradec Champions

Career statistics

Regular season 

|-
|style="background-color:#FFCCCC" align="left" | 2016-17
| align="left" | Akita
|2 ||0 || 2.0 ||.000  || .000 ||.000  || 0.0 || 0.0 || 0.0 ||0.0  || 0.0
|-
| align="left" | 2017-18
| align="left" | Akita
|26 ||2 || 12.2 ||.340  || .367 ||.645  || 1.8 ||1.5  || 1.0 ||0.1  || 4.0
|-
| align="left" | 2018-19
| align="left" | Akita
| 57||  21 || 18.0    ||  .368  || .311  ||  .804 ||  1.5  ||   1.3 ||  0.7 ||  0.0  ||5.9
|-
| align="left" | 2019-20
| align="left" | Akita
| 35||  14 || 20.8    ||  .383  || .286  ||  .736 ||  1.6  ||   1.7 ||  1.1 ||  0.1  ||9.1
|-
| align="left" | 2020-21
| align="left" | Akita
| 57||  25 || 16.7    ||  .331  || .240  ||  .735 ||  1.6  ||   1.6 ||  0.7 ||  0.1  ||6.2
|-

Playoffs 

|-
|style="text-align:left;"|2017-18
|style="text-align:left;"|Akita
| 3 || 0 || 10.15 || .444 || .444 || .000 || 1.3 || 0.7 || 0.3 || 0 || 4.0
|-

Early cup games 

|-
|style="text-align:left;"|2018
|style="text-align:left;"|Akita
| 2 || 0 || 16.06 || .111 || .000 || .000 || 3.0 || 0.5 || 2.0 || 0 || 1.0
|-

Preseason games

|-
| align="left" |2018
| align="left" | Akita
| 2 || 0 || 6.2 || .000 ||.000  || .000||0.5 || 0.5|| 0.5 || 0.0 ||  0.0
|-
| align="left" |2019
| align="left" | Akita
| 1 || 0 || 11.3 || .143 ||.200  || .000||0.0 || 0.0|| 0.0 || 0.0 ||  3.0
|-

Source: Changwon1Changwon2
Source: Utsunomiya

Trivia
He loves sleeping and practices.
Spaghetti aglio e olio is his favorite dish.
He likes not wearing socks in winter.

External links
3x3 Japan 2019
stats

References

1995 births
Living people
3x3 basketball players at the 2020 Summer Olympics
Akita Northern Happinets players
Japanese men's basketball players
Japan national 3x3 basketball team players
Olympic 3x3 basketball players of Japan
Sportspeople from Saitama Prefecture
Shooting guards
Small forwards